Nancy Drew on Campus is a series of twenty-five books published as a young adult spin-off from the long-running Nancy Drew mystery series. The series was published between 1995 and 1998  by Simon & Schuster's Young Adult imprint Simon Pulse and followed Nancy and her friends as they attended college and dealt with issues such as date rape and drug usage.  

Nancy Drew on Campus utilized reader interaction, most notably in the first two books where they were asked to call a 1-800 number to decide whether Nancy and her boyfriend Ned were to break up or stay together. Nancy Drew ends her relationship to Ned Nickerson in the second book in the series, supposedly based on reader feedback to the telephone poll in the previous book. 

This series focused more on romance and problems facing teens than on mysteries. A large group of new characters was introduced and became the focus of story-lines during the run of the series. Nancy Drew works as a reporter for the school newspaper and becomes involved in minor mysteries, often the sub-plot or tertiary plot of the book. The larger secondary cast takes center stage as they deal with drugs, potential pregnancy, date rape, and other incidents that are the staples of the genre.           

The series was cancelled in 1997, when Simon & Schuster decided to cancel all Nancy Drew & Hardy Boys spin-offs.

Synopsis
The series followed Nancy and her friends George and Bess as they attend the fictional Wilder University. Nancy is attending in order to receive a degree in journalism, much to the chagrin of her longtime boyfriend Ned Nickerson, who wants her to attend Emerson College with him instead. Despite initial attempts to make their relationship work, the two break up in the second book On Her Own after Nancy decides that Ned is too controlling.

List of books in the series

 New Lives, New Loves
 On Her Own
 Don't Look Back
 Tell Me the Truth
 Secret Rules
 It's Your Move
 False Friends
 Getting Closer
 Broken Promises
 Party Weekend
 In the Name of Love
 Just the Two of Us
 Campus Exposures
 Hard to Get
 Loving and Losing
 Going Home
 New Beginnings
 Keeping Secrets
 Love On-Line
 Jealous Feelings
 Love and Betrayal
 In and Out of Love
 Otherwise Engaged
 In the Spotlight
 Snowbound

Reception
Reception to the series was mixed, with some critics viewing the inclusion of adult themes such as date rape "unsuccessful". In her book Sisters, Schoolgirls, and Sleuths, Carolyn Carpan commented that the series was "more soap opera romance than mystery" and that Nancy "comes across as dumb, missing easy clues she wouldn't have missed in previous series". The series was also criticized for focusing more on romance than on grades or studying, with one critic stating that the series resembled collegiate academic studying in the 1950s, where "women were more interested in pursuing ... the "MRS" degree."

References

Young adult novel series
 
Novels about rape